Batrachosauroididae is an extinct family of prehistoric salamanders with holarctic distribution. They were paedomorphic and presumably aquatic. They are possibly the sister taxon of Proteidae, an extant family of aquatic salamanders. They are definitively known from the Late Cretaceous to Miocene of North America and Europe. Remains from the earliest Cretaceous (Berriasian) Lulworth Formation of England have tenatively been attributed to this family.

The following genera are included:
Batrachosauroides United States, Eocene-Miocene
Opisthotriton North America, Late Cretaceous-Paleocene
Palaeoproteus Europe Paleocene-Miocene
Parrisia United States, Late Cretaceous
Peratosauroides United States, Miocene
Prodesmodon North America Late Cretaceous-Paleocene

See also
 Prehistoric amphibian
 List of prehistoric amphibians

References

Cretaceous salamanders
Cretaceous first appearances
Miocene extinctions
Cenozoic salamanders